Fernand Carez (born 28 October 1905, date of death unknown) was a Belgian ice hockey player. He competed in the men's tournament at the 1936 Winter Olympics.

References

1905 births
Year of death missing
Olympic ice hockey players of Belgium
Ice hockey players at the 1936 Winter Olympics
Sportspeople from Brussels
Belgian ice hockey defencemen
Belgian ice hockey forwards